Makin Group (PT Matahari Kahuripan Indonesia)
is a palm oil company from Indonesia.
It is based in Jakarta.
In Jambi province, Makin Group reportedly operates or used to operate on peatlands.

It has 1.7 million hectares dedicated to oil palm (2009).
Within its area, there was illegal commercial land clearing on its area.

References

Palm oil companies of Indonesia
Companies based in Jakarta